"Agua Caliente" is the eighth episode of the American crime comedy-drama television series Terriers. The episode was written by Phoef Sutton and Jon Worley, and directed by John Dahl. It was first broadcast on FX in the United States on October 27, 2010.

The series is set in Ocean Beach, San Diego and focuses on ex-cop and recovering alcoholic Hank Dolworth (Donal Logue) and his best friend, former criminal Britt Pollack (Michael Raymond-James), who both decide to open an unlicensed private investigation business. In the episode, Britt is kidnapped by the cartel and forced to help them in recovering a drug package, or Katie will die.

According to Nielsen Media Research, the episode was seen by an estimated 0.465 million household viewers and gained a 0.2/1 ratings share among adults aged 18–49. The episode received extremely positive reviews from critics, who praised the writing, tension, performances and character development.

Plot
Hank (Donal Logue) and Britt (Michael Raymond-James) visit a golf course to give legal papers to a member. The member tries to evade them but Hank catches him up. As he leaves, he discovers that Britt is missing, finding his cellphone in the ground.

With Maggie (Jamie Denbo) and Katie (Laura Allen) unaware of his location, Hank asks Mark (Rockmond Dunbar) for help. They visit the golf course, where they gain access to the CCTV footage. The footage shows that Britt was taken by men in a car, with licence plates pointing to Baja California, suggesting that the cartel was involved. Mark contacts a friend, DEA Agent Samuel Weisdorf (Keith Szarabajka), who reviews the footage and recognizes the driver as Felipe Padro (Jose Pablo Cantillo), an enforcer for the cartel. With this information, Hank and Mark cross the border to find Britt.

Britt finds himself in Tijuana, also discovering that Ray (Maximiliano Hernández) has been taken by the cartel as well. The cartel used Ray as a delivery man but he failed to deliver a drug package, which is now in police custody. Ray suggested that they should get Britt, explaining his kidnapping. They want Britt to break into the police station and get the package back, threatening retaliation against Katie if he fails to do the task. Britt and Ray then fight in a bar, which leads to their arrest. The arrest alerts Hank and Mark of Britt's location.

At prison, Britt uses a tool to leave his cell, while Ray incapacitates some of the guards and steals a uniform. Britt breaks into the evidence room, eventually finding the drug package. They escape the station, just as Hank and Mark arrive. They return to Prado's hideout, only to discover that his boss Javier de la Rosa (Manuel E. Urrego) holds him at gunpoint for failing to deliver the package and kills him, worrying Britt as Prado needed to make a call to cancel the hit on Katie. He appears in front of de la Rosa and gives him the package, only asking for Prado's cellphone. De la Rosa accepts and Britt and Ray leave the hideout.

As they evade authorities, Britt uses the cellphone to contact Katie. Unfortunately, she is taking an exam and leaves the class without it. He then calls Hank, realizing that he is in Tijuana too. They meet and, in order to avoid the search by the Mexican police, decide to put Britt in the trunk of the car as they try to cross the border. Britt fails to communicate with Katie, who is held at gunpoint by a hitman. Professor Owen (Johnny Sneed) visits Katie to discuss their one night stand and is also held at gunpoint. 

As Hank, Britt and Mark arrive at San Diego, they find the hitman's car and hurriedly enter the apartment. The hitman holds Katie hostage, until he is hit by Hank. The hitman shoots Hank, only to be killed by Mark. As Hank is taken by the ambulance, he warns Owen to stay away from Katie or he will ruin his personal and professional life.

Reception

Viewers
The episode was watched by 0.465 million viewers, earning a 0.2/1 in the 18-49 rating demographics on the Nielson ratings scale. This means that 0.2 percent of all households with televisions watched the episode, while 1 percent of all households watching television at that time watched it. This was a slight increase in viewership from the previous episode, which was watched by 0.444 million viewers with a 0.2/1 in the 18-49 rating demographics.

Critical reviews
"Agua Caliente" received extremely positive reviews from critics. Noel Murray of The A.V. Club gave the episode an "A-" grade and wrote, "'Agua Caliente' has more of a unified storyline than the last couple of episodes, and though it's bound together by a strong theme, it's not as blunt about expressing it as 'Ring-A-Ding-Ding' or 'Missing Persons.' This episode was all about exploring the partnership of Hank and Britt, by pulling them apart." 

Alan Sepinwall of HitFix wrote, "Terriers has been on such a roll for the last month-plus that it was inevitable there would be a let-down episode, and 'Agua Caliente' fit the bill. It wasn't a bad episode, but one that felt oddly slight, if such a description can apply to an episode in which Katie was in danger throughout, Britt and Hank spent a lot of time in the company of their former partners, Katie's adulterous professor got involved in a hostage situation with her and Hank got shot." Matt Richenthal of TV Fanatic gave the episode a 4.2 star rating out of 5 and wrote, "This is how a great show does a standalone episode. 'Agua Caliente' featured Britt getting snatched up by the Mexican cartel, reuniting briefly with his former partner and then returning to the States in time to help Mark and Hank save Katie's life. That plot on its own served up intrigue, suspense and a few funny lines. But Terriers has created a world in which everything is connected, as Ray was only south of the border because Britt set him up to get arrested a few episodes ago; while Katie's professor was only involved in her hostage situation because... you know. Shhh, don't tell Britt."

References

External links
 

2010 American television episodes
Terriers episodes
Television episodes directed by John Dahl
Television episodes set in Mexico